was a district located in Toyama Prefecture, Japan.

As of 2003, the district had an estimated population of 34,491 and a density of 53.31 persons per km2. The total area was 646.98 km2.

Towns and villages
The district had two towns:

 Ōsawano
 Ōyama

History

District Timeline
 1889 (8 towns, 50 villages)
 At the time of enforcing the city status, the town of Toyama gained city status.
 At the time of enforcing the town and village status, the district formed into 8 towns and 49 villages.
 April 1, 1896 - 5 towns and 28 villages split and created Nakaniikawa District. (3 towns, 21 villages)

Recent mergers
 On April 1, 2005 - The towns of Ōsawano and Ōyama, along with the towns of Fuchū and Yatsuo, and the villages of Hosoiri and Yamada (all from Nei District), were merged into the expanded city of Toyama. Therefore, Kaminiikawa District and Nei District were dissolved as a result of this merger.

See also
 List of dissolved districts of Japan

Former districts of Toyama Prefecture